I Corps Band or America's First Corps Band (officially referred to as the 56th Army Band) is an American military band maintained by the United States Army and is attached to the Army's I Corps in United States Army Forces Command. It is currently one of two Army bands in the Pacific Northwest, the other being the 133d Army Band (Washington Army National Guard) based at Camp Murray.  The 56th is currently based at Joint Base Lewis–McChord outside of Tacoma, Washington.

Ensembles
These ensembles include:

Brass Quintet
Woodwind Quintet
Jazz Combo
Rock Band
Brass Band
Concert Band
Ceremonial Band

Performances

Outside ceremonial performances, the band also performs throughout the Tacoma community, which frequently include K-12 schools as well as community concerts and parades. A member of the band often performs at the regimental ball of the Military Police Corps in Tacoma, Washington. It also performs at the annual international band concert with the Naden Band of Maritime Forces Pacific and Navy Band Northwest at the Bremerton Performing Arts Center. Being a music entity, the jazz band of the I Corps Band has performed on multiple media networks such as KNKX, which is the National Public Radio's jazz-based radio format for the Seattle metropolitan area. In May 2014, during a concert by the band that was streamed live at a high school in Oswego, Illinois, the band held a Q&A with the local students who saw the band during an assembly. In the summer of 2016, it performed at a memorial service in Enoggera, Queensland, Australia as part of the Talisman Saber exercise.

Lineage
The lineage of the band is as follows:

Founded on 28 October 1938 in the Regular Army as the Band, 41st Engineer Regiment
Activated on 18 November 1940 at Fort Bragg, North Carolina
Redesignated on 1 August 1942 as the Band, 41st Engineer General Service Regiment 
Redesignated on 12 October 1943 as the Band, 9th Infantry Division in Sicily, Italy and activated 2 and a half weeks later 
Reorganized and redesignated on 24 July 1944 as the 419th Army Service Forces Band
Redesignated on 11 June 1946 as the 419th Band
Deactivated on 10 February 1947 at Fort Dix, New Jersey
Redesignated on 17 May 1947 as the 419th Army Band
Redesignated 22 January 1948 as the 56th Army Band
Activated 15 March 1948 in Japan
Deactivated 24 June 1958 in Japan
Activated 1 November 1962 at Fort Chaffee, Arkansas
Deactivated 24 March 1965 at Fort Chaffee, Arkansas
Activated 20 July 1965 at Fort Polk, Louisiana
Deactivated on 25 May 1970 at Fort Polk, Louisiana
Reassigned on 8 July 1991 at Fort Lewis, Washington
Activated 16 November 1994 at Fort Lewis, Washington

Unit honors and accolades
Meritorious Unit Commendation (1968)
Order of the Day of the Belgian Army  
Gallantry Cross (South Vietnam) (1969) 
Civil Actions Medal 1st Class
Army Commendation Medal

See also
Signal Corps Band
U.S. Army Band

External links

Official Website
JBLM 56th Army Band Performs
SPC Kiari Mhoon's National Anthem
America's First Corps Army Band on YouTube

References

Bands of the United States Army
Military units and formations established in 1991
Military units and formations established in 1938
Tacoma, Washington